Serhiy Shpak is a Ukrainian retired footballer.

Career
Serhiy Shpak is a pupil of Volyn Lutsk football. Played for Volyn Lutsk, Kovel-Volyn-2, Ikva Mlyniv, Chelmyanka (Chelm, Poland), Mykolaiv, Desna Chernihiv, Enerhetyk Burshtyn and CSKA Kyiv. As a Volyn Lutsk player, on 23 July 2005 he played the only match in Ukrainian Premier League. In this game against Arsenal Kiev, he entered the field in the 87th minute, replacing the Romanian legionnaire Constantin Schumacher. In the understudy tournament he played 33 matches for Volyn Lutsk, scored 1 goal. In January 2006 he moved to Desna Chernihiv, the main club in the city of Chernihiv, where he won the Ukrainian Second League in the season 2005–06. In 2009, while playing for CSKA Kyiv, he was injured, due to which he remained out of football for a whole year. After his recovery, the player's agent invited him to try his hand at the Finnish championship. Sergei agreed, went through the training camp and as a result signed a contract with the team of Veikkausliga "Yaro". In the club of Alexei Eremenko, Shpak played 8 matches in total in all tournaments and in the course of the season moved to the team of the lower division "KPV".

Honours
Desna Chernihiv
 Ukrainian Second League: 2005–06

References

External links 
 Serhiy Shpak at footballfacts.ru
 Serhiy Shpak at allplayers.in.ua

1984 births
Living people
FC Desna Chernihiv players
FC Ikva Mlyniv players
FC Enerhetyk Burshtyn players
Ukrainian footballers
Ukrainian Premier League players
Ukrainian First League players
Ukrainian Second League players
Ukrainian expatriate sportspeople in Finland
Expatriate footballers in Finland
Association football defenders
FF Jaro players